KDCU-DT (channel 31) is a television station licensed to Derby, Kansas, United States, serving the Wichita–Hutchinson market as an affiliate of the Spanish-language Univision network. Owned by Entravision Communications, the station maintains offices on East Douglas Avenue in downtown Wichita, while newscasts are actually produced at the KCEC studios (where KDCU is also actually managed at) on Mile High Stadium West Circle in Denver, Colorado. KDCU-DT's transmitter is located in rural northwestern Sedgwick County (north-northeast of Colwich).

History

The station first signed on the air on August 20, 2009, becoming the first (and so far only) full-power Spanish-language television station to sign on in the state of Kansas; because it signed on after the June 12 digital television transition that year, KDCU was also the first full-power television station in the Wichita–Hutchinson Plus market to sign-on without a companion analog signal.

Prior to the station's sign-on, on February 15, 2008, Entravision entered into a joint sales agreement with Schurz Communications (then-owner of KWCH-DT and KSCW-DT), in which Schurz would provide advertising, production and promotional responsibilities as well as back office and master control services for KDCU. Schurz also leased a transmission tower located near Colwich to house the station's transmitter facilities; KSCW, which previously used the tower, moved its transmitter facilities to a tower east of Hutchinson in Reno County, which is known as the KWCH 12 Tower. Since KDCU is licensed as a full-power station, it is able to mandate carriage on cable and satellite providers in the Wichita–Hutchinson Plus market.

Schurz announced on September 14, 2015 that it would exit broadcasting and sell its television and radio stations, including KWCH-DT, KSCW-DT, and the JSA/SSA with KDCU-DT, to Gray Television for $442.5 million. The FCC approved the sale on February 12, 2016.

As of 2021, Entravision now both owns and operates KDCU-DT, as Gray sold its operation stake in the station.

Newscasts
KDCU-DT presently broadcasts 2½ hours of locally produced newscasts each week (with a half-hour each weekday); the station does not air newscasts on Saturdays or Sundays. In April 2011, KWCH produced a half-hour nightly Spanish-language newscast for KDCU, Noticias Univision Kansas, airing at 10:00 p.m. each weeknight (which competed against KWCH's own local newscast in that timeslot). Since Entravision acquired full shares of KDCU, the newscasts are now self-produced.

Technical information

Subchannels
The station's digital signal is multiplexed:

References

External links

DCU-DT
Television channels and stations established in 2009
2009 establishments in Kansas
Univision network affiliates
Spanish-language television stations in Kansas
Entravision Communications stations
Grit (TV network) affiliates
Ion Mystery affiliates
Laff (TV network) affiliates
Court TV affiliates